Nikolaos "Nikos" Georgeas (born 27 December 1976) is a Greek former professional footballer who played as a right-back. He is the current administrative director of AEK Athens Academy.

Club career
Georgeas started his football career at the Mani Platsa club. At the age of 19 he joined the team of Black Storm. Georgeas spent almost his entire career playing for AEK Athens. Fans have a lot of respect on him, because of his passion and love in AEK Athens' badge after spending 12 years at the club. On May 26, 2008 Georgeas signed a new 2-year contract which will keep him at the club until 2010. Georgeas is also regarded to be one of the club's most loyal players and was voted in the top 10 legend list of AEK Athens history. In the 2010/11 season, Georgeas scored his first goal for the club after spending 12 years at the club and scored against Ergotelis in a 2-3 away win. Georgeas also scored his second goal for the club just weeks later, against Larissa. Next year, his coach Nikos Kostenoglou wanted to utilize his talent and experience, something that led Kostenoglou to try Georgeas in a new position; as a defensive midfielder. Georgeas, who the previous season did not make AEK's starting eleven, tried to meet the expectations of his team coach and managed to be proved as a tool, as he could play in more than one position. Moreover, he was chosen to be the captain in some games being the oldest player in the team.

In July 2012, Georgeas' contract with AEK ended, bringing to a close a 12 years at the club. Veria was the next stop in his career, counting 18 appearances and several of them as team captain. After the end of the one-year contract with Veria, AEK decided to bring back Nikos Georgeas to play in the third division. He was considered one of the leaders in AEK's effort to return to the Super League. At the end of the 2014-15 season, with AEK Athens being promoted to the first division, Georgeas decided to finish his career in his favourite team. He is famous for the chant that AEK fans have dedicated to him, with the lyrics "Georgea, Georgea, ta fyta stin Kalamata einai oraia!", which means "Georgeas, Georgeas, (the) plants in Kalamata are nice!", a reference to the footballer's birthplace, Kalamata, in southern Greece, and to the weed produced widely in the area.

In 2015, Georgeas retired from professional football.

After football
Since September 2019, Georgeas has been heading the administration of the AEK Academy together with Konstantinos Papapostolou.

Controversy

Veria vs Olympiacos
Additional suspects include Veria Director of Football Giorgos Lanaris and former owner Giorgos Arvanitidis, regarding 6 January 2013 match of Olympiacos F.C. against Veria F.C. Veria player Nikolaos Georgeas and club's manager Dimitris Kalaitzidis at the time, testified in March 2015 that Lanaris following Arvanitidis orders demanded from Veria players to lose with a 3–0 score, which eventually happened.
According to Andreadis, both Marinakis and Arvanitidis had agreed on the match fixing.

Veria player Alexandros Kalogeris confirmed Georgeas' testimony, at the Athens  court houses,  that he entered the game in the second half after being instructed by the team manager to lose the game 3-0. The scandal has seen revelations about a series of dramatic events including phone tapping by Greece's intelligence agency, the involvement of Interpol, the bombing of a referee's premises, and a row erupting between the new Greek government and UEFA and FIFA. Football violence has also spiralled out of control, with riot police regularly seen on the pitch. However, despite the long-running investigation into match-fixing, no one has yet been jailed. Five people have been sentenced to time in prison but were subsequently freed on appeal. Charges against a number of the accused have been dropped and there are fears that, like so many other investigations in Greece, they will fizzle out.

Career statistics
{| class="wikitable" style="text-align:center"
|-
! colspan=3 | Club performance
! colspan=2 | League
! colspan=2 | Cup1
! colspan=2 | Continental
! colspan=2 | Total
|-
! Season !! Club !! League
! Apps !! Goals
! Apps !! Goals
! Apps !! Goals
! Apps !! Goals
|-
|-
! colspan=3 | Greece
! colspan=2 | League
! colspan=2 | Greek Cup
! colspan=2 | Europe
! colspan=2 | Total
|-
|rowspan=2|1995–96
|Kalamata
|Alpha Ethniki
|0||0||1||0||0||0||1||0
|-
|PAS Giannina
|Beta Ethniki
|19||0||2||0||0||0||21||0
|-
|1996–97
|rowspan=5|Kalamata
|rowspan=2|Alpha Ethniki
|19||0||2||0||0||0||21||0
|-
|1997–98
|0||0||0||0||0||0||0||0
|-
|1998–99
|Beta Ethniki
|13||0||1||0||0||0||14||0
|-
|1999–00
|rowspan=2|Alpha Ethniki
|28||1||8||0||0||0||36||1
|-
|rowspan=2|2000–01
|5||0||9||0||0||0||14||0
|-
|rowspan=12|AEK Athens
|rowspan=6|Alpha Ethniki
|9||0||0||0||0||0||9||0
|-
|2001–02
|21||0||12||0||8||0||41||0
|-
|2002–03
|16||0||8||0||2||0||26||0
|-
|2003–04
|12||0||4||0||6||0||22||0
|-
|2004–05
|6||0||1||0||2||0||9||0
|-
|2005–06
|25||0||5||0||0||0||30||0
|-
|2006–07
|rowspan=6|Super League
|12||0||1||0||7||0||20||0
|-
|2007–08
|8||0||0||0||0||0||8||0
|-
|2008–09
|24||0||5||0||0||0||29||0
|-
|2009–10
|16||0||1||0||5||0||22||0
|-
|2010–11
|12||1||4||1||1||0||17||2
|-
|2011–12
|27||0||2||0||4||0||33||0
|-
|2012–13
|Veria
|Super League
|18||0||0||0||0||0||18||0
|-
|2013–14
|AEK Athens
|Football League 2
|26||0||4||1||0||0||30||1
|-
|2014–15
|AEK Athens
|Football League
|11||0||0||0||0||0||11||0
|-
! colspan=3 | Career total
!327||2||70||2||35||0||432||4

1 Includes 4 caps and 1 goal in the semi-pro Football League 2 Cup.

Honours
AEK Athens F.C.
Greek Cup: 2001–02, 2010–11
Football League: 2014–15
Football League 2: 2013–14  (6th Group)

Individual
Best Super League Greece Team: 2011–12

References

1976 births
Living people
Greek footballers
Super League Greece players
Football League (Greece) players
AEK Athens F.C. players
Kalamata F.C. players
PAS Giannina F.C. players
Veria F.C. players
AEK F.C. non-playing staff
Association football defenders
Footballers from Kalamata